"Our Lives" is a song by American rock band the Calling. It was released on March 29, 2004, as the lead single from their second studio album, Two (2004). This single peaked at number 13 on the UK Singles Chart, number two on the UK Rock Chart, and reached the top 20 in Denmark and Italy. It was used as the theme song to the short lived series "Clubhouse" on CBS.

Music video

The music video for the song was directed by Liz Friedlander.

Track listings
UK CD1
 "Our Lives" – 3:56
 "For You" (acoustic) – 3:27
 "London Calling" (live) – 2:09
 "Our Lives" (video) – 3:50

UK CD2 and European CD single
 "Our Lives" – 3:56
 "London Calling" (live) – 2:09

Australian CD single
 "Our Lives" – 3:56
 "For You" (acoustic) – 3:27
 "London Calling" (live) – 2:09

Charts

Release history

References

2004 singles
2004 songs
The Calling songs
Music videos directed by Liz Friedlander
RCA Records singles
Songs written by Aaron Kamin
Songs written by Alex Band